Polski Cukier (actually: Krajowa Spółka Cukrowa Spółka Akcyjna, abbreviated to  KSC Polski Cukier S.A., literally: Polish Sugar) - founded in August 2002 after the consortium with the headquarters in Toruń. Krajowa Spółka Cukrowa (KSC) had taken over many companies around the country. The cooperative belongs to the State Treasury.

Structure

In 2002 the company seized the following sugar refineries:

 Borowiczki Sugar Refinery  (closed)
 Brześć Kujawski Sugar Refinery (closed)
 Częstocice Sugar Refinery
 Dobrzelin Sugar Refinery
 Gryfice Sugar Refinery
 Janikowo Sugar Refinery
 Klemensów Sugar Refinery (closed) 
 Stargard Sugar Refinery
 Siennica Nadolna Sugar Refinery
 Kruszwica Sugar Refinery
 Lublin Sugar Refinery (closed)
 Łapy Sugar Refinery (closed)
 Malbork Sugar Refinery
 Mała Wieś Sugar Refinery (closed in the year 2006)
 Nakło Sugar Refinery
 Nowy Staw Sugar Refinery (closed on 1 June 2007)
 Opole Lubelskie Sugar Refinery (closed)
 Ostrowy Sugar Refinery
 Przeworsk Sugar Refinery
 Pruszcz Gdański Sugar Refinery (closed)
 Rejowie Sugar Refinery
 Sokołów Podlaski Sugar Refinery
 Szczecin Sugar Refinery
 Tuczno Sugar Refinery (closed)
 Werbkowice Sugar Refinery
 Wożuczyn Sugar Refinery
 Żnin Sugar Refinery (closed)

The cooperative had been the main owner of the  Leśmierz Sugar Refinery and smaller sugar refineries in : Baborów, Polska Cerekiew, Chełmża, Chybie, Jawor, Krasiniec, Lewin Brzeski (Wróblin Sugar Refinery), Łagiewniki, Małoszyn, Mełno, Opalenica, Ostrowite, Otmuchów, Pastuchów, Pustków, Lower Silesian Voivodeship, Racibórz, Ropczyce, Strzelin, Strzyżów, Szamotuły, Świdnica, Wieluń, Włostów, Wrocław and Włostów.

References

Cooperatives in Poland